"Come to Nothing" is the third single by Evermore, taken from their debut album, Dreams. It was released in May 2005 and peaked at No. 51 on the ARIA Singles Chart. It appeared as a split single on CD with two live music videos by Evermore, "It's Too Late" and "Come to Nothing"; and a track each by theredsunband: "Devil Song, the Panda Band: "Eyelashes", and the Vasco Era: "Don't Go to Sleep".

Reception 

Greg Prato of AllMusic, in his review of the album, described how "Evermore has yet to find their own sound and approach, as evidenced by many tracks that sound like they could have easily been plucked from either Absolution or The Bends – especially 'It's Too Late' and 'Come to Nothing.' IGNs Chad Grischow observed, "The sloppy rocker, 'Come to Nothing' is the first track on the album that does not quite sound up to par; marking the beginning of the decline on the album." Robyn Gallagher of 5000 Ways analysed the related music video, "[it is] heavy-handed with symbolism, putting Jon and his bros into a derelict, fire-gutted house. We also see a young woman wandering the same house, but staying well away from Evermore. Just as well. It seems they have some issues... [it] is shot in desaturated colours, creating a gloomy world where a relationship break-up feels like the least awful thing that could happen in an average day."

Track listing

Personnel

Evermore
 Jon Hume – vocals, guitars
 Peter Hume – keyboards, piano, bass, vocals
 Dann Hume – drums, percussion, vocals

theredsunband
 Elizabeth Kelly – keyboards, keyboard bass
 Sarah Kelly – lead guitar, vocals
 John Matthews – drums

the Panda Band
 David Namour – bass guitar
 Stephen Callan – keyboards
 Chris Callan – guitar, backing vocals
 Scott Lee Howard – drums, percussion
 Damian Crosbie – lead vocals, guitar

the Vasco Era
 Sid O'Neil – vocals, guitar, lapsteel, rototoms
 Ted O'Neil – bass guitar
 Michael Fitzgerald – drums

Release history

References 

Evermore (band) songs
2005 singles
2004 songs
East West Records singles
Songs written by Dann Hume